Kuzhali is a 2022 Indian Tamil-language drama film directed by Chera Kalaiyarasan starring Vignesh and Aara. It was released on 23 September 2022.

Cast
Vignesh as Subramani
Aara  as Kuzhali
Maha
Shalini
Senthi Kumari
Alex

Production
The film began production in early 2017, with Vignesh and Esther Anil cast in the lead role. However, despite beginning shoot, the actress later left the project and was replaced by Aara .

Reception
The film was released on 23 September 2022 across Tamil Nadu. A critic from Maalai Malar gave the film a positive review, noting that it was "pleasant", and marking it 2.75 out of 5 stars. A reviewer from Dinamalar gave the film a mixed review.

References

External links

2022 films
2020s Tamil-language films